Stefan Radoja (born 28 November 1990) is a Serbian former football midfielder. He is an older brother of Nemanja Radoja.

Career
Born in Novi Sad, Radoja was with ČSK Čelarevo in 2008–09 season, but he made his first senior appearances with Mladost Bački Jarak, where he spent next three seasons. After one season with Novi Sad, Radoja moved to OFK Bačka. In the beginning of 2015, he joined Kecskemét, but he returned to Bačka after 6 months. In summer 2016, he made his own decision to end his football career, but rumors says that he had a cardiac problem.

Career statistics

References

External links
 
 

1990 births
Living people
Footballers from Novi Sad
Association football midfielders
Serbian footballers
RFK Novi Sad 1921 players
OFK Bačka players
Serbian expatriate footballers
Serbian expatriate sportspeople in Hungary
Expatriate footballers in Hungary
Kecskeméti TE players
Nemzeti Bajnokság I players
Serbian First League players